The Metropolitan Police Act 1899 (62 and 63 Vict, c. 26) was the last of a series of 19th century Metropolitan Police Acts.

It dealt with the Metropolitan Police's Commissioner, Assistant Commissioners and Receiver. It allowed for the Secretary of State and the Treasury to set the pay of the Commissioner, Receiver (Section 1.1) and the Assistant Commissioners (Section 1.2). It allowed for the Assistant Commissioners' wages to be paid out of the Metropolitan Police Fund and/or moneys provided by Parliament, with an annual maximum of £1,200 on the amount Parliament had to allocate for that purpose (Section 1.2).

It exempted from the Act's provisions the Registrar of Anthropometric Measurements and anyone who wrote to the Secretary of State within a month of the Act's passing asking to remain on his salary and allowances as on 1 January 1899 as opposed to the salary provided for under the Act (Section 1.3). It also provided for the Act to come into effect on 1 October 1899.

Sources

United Kingdom Acts of Parliament 1899
Police legislation in the United Kingdom